"Marriage of Figaro" is the third episode of the first season of the American television drama series Mad Men. It was written by Tom Palmer and directed by Ed Bianchi. The episode originally aired on the AMC channel in the United States on August 2, 2007.

Plot
The mystery of Don's past deepens when he is caught off guard by a man on the train who recognizes him from their days in the Korean War and refers to him as "Dick Whitman." Don acknowledges the man and makes non-committal plans about getting together, while avoiding giving him any true information about his current identity as Don Draper.

Pete arrives at Sterling Cooper, back from his honeymoon. When he goes to his office, he is startled to discover several people dressed as Chinese peasants, along with several live chickens. Pete realizes he's been pranked while the rest of the staff of Sterling Cooper laughs at their joke. Meanwhile, Don discusses Doyle Dane Bernbach's new ad campaigns for Volkswagen. He hates it, while Roger is puzzled why a Jewish advertising executive would want to help the Germans, while Pete says it's "brilliant." 

Peggy greets Pete, who lets her know that things must be different now that he's married, and Peggy reassures him that their dalliance "never happened". Later, Peggy chats with the other women of the office, who are giggling about reading Lady Chatterley's Lover. They comment how men won't read it because it's romantic, and Joan comments how it shows that most people think marriage is a joke, due to the extensive infidelity in the novel. The scene then cuts to the men in a meeting, joking about the appeal of one's wife dying. Earlier, Pete's friends—Ken, Harry, and Paul—try to get him to tell them about his honeymoon, but Pete says he is a changed man and refuses to tell any salacious tales. Later, Pete and Harry talk about being married and fidelity vs. infidelity.

Don meets again with Rachel Menken. That afternoon, he meets her at the store, where she gives him a tour and tells him stories about when she was a young girl and her father ran the store. On the rooftop, she shows him the store's guard dogs. She tells Don that her mother died giving birth to her and Don kisses her impulsively, then admits to her that he is married. In response, Rachel tells Don that she wants someone else put in charge of her account.

That weekend, Don and Betty prepare for Sally's birthday party. Don spends the morning assembling a playhouse for her while heavily drinking beer. When the guests arrive, the children play outside while Betty gossips with the other housewives about Helen Bishop, a divorcée who has just moved into the neighborhood. Helen, arrives at the party with her son Glen, but she is treated like an outcast due to her failed marriage. They imply to her that she's promiscuous, and the ladies also find it highly suspicious that she frequently goes for long walks in the neighborhood. The fathers at the party, meanwhile, leer at her and one propositions her.

Don films the party with a handheld camera, and notices in all of the suburban flirtations, gossiping, back-biting, and one-upmanship, one couple sharing a genuinely tender and loving moment, which appears to distress him. Betty sees Don and Helen standing together, and quickly rushes out to ask him to pick up Sally's birthday cake. However, after getting the cake, he drives by his house without stopping. Betty is humiliated in front of all of the neighbors, while the children are disappointed. He finally returns late that night, the party long over, accompanied by a dog. Don gives Sally the dog as a gift. This recalls what Rachel told him on the roof about how a dog can be everything to a little girl. However, Betty's reaction is ambivalent.

Cultural references
The episode's title refers to the Mozart opera of the same name, which can also be heard playing on the radio during Sally's party.

The creative team at Sterling Cooper discuss the "Think Small" and "Lemon" campaigns, which was considered revolutionary in the advertising industry during the time in which the episode is set.

Reception
Although critics' reviews for "Marriage of Figaro" were not unanimously positive, most saw character development as a strength of the episode. Alan Sepinwall of New Jersey's The Star-Ledger enjoyed the focus on Don's identity, which he wrote was the show's "most involving element" at that point in the series. In 2013, Emily VanDerWerff of The A.V. Club graded the episode an "A−", praising its having delved into Don's character in what was only a third episode. Six years after its initial airing, VanDerWerff wrote retrospectively:The task Mad Men set for itself from very early in its run was a tough one. Lacking the sorts of obvious external stakes that drive many of its cable drama cousins, the show was forced to figure out ways to portray interiority, the psychological makeup and emotional lives of its characters, without often resorting to them simply sitting down and telling us how they feel. It’s for this reason that so many people I know have struggled with the show for several episodes—if not several seasons—until everything finally clicks in some episode and they realize the scope and ambition of what the show has pulled off. Mad Men is a show about things like anomie and emptiness, about boredom and frustration and intimacy. It’s a show where the big moment can sometimes be something as simple as a beautiful woman sliding a handsome man’s cufflink back to him when it drops from his wrist. 'The Marriage Of Figaro' has a very deliberate work/home split, following Don Draper in both environments and seeing how he fits (or doesn’t fit) in either one.

References

External links
"Marriage of Figaro" at AMC

Mad Men (season 1) episodes
2007 American television episodes
Television episodes directed by Ed Bianchi